General elections were held in Japan on November 9, 2003. Incumbent Prime Minister Junichiro Koizumi of the Liberal Democrat Party won the election but with a reduced majority. The main opposition Democratic Party made considerable gains, winning 177 of the 480 seats in the House of Representatives, its largest share ever. Other traditional parties like the Communist Party and the Social Democrat Party lost a significant numbers of seats, making a two-party system a possibility in later Japanese politics.

Background
On October 11, 2003, Prime Minister Junichiro Koizumi dissolved the House of Representatives of the Diet after he was re-elected as the Liberal Democrat Party chief on September 20. The dissolution was based on Article 7 of the Constitution of Japan, which can be interpreted as saying that the Prime Minister has the power to dissolve the lower house after so advising the Emperor.
The election was the first since Koizumi was named Prime Minister in April 2001. The major participants were the Liberal Democrat Party (LDP) and the Democrat Party (DPJ). The LDP retains strong support in rural areas and among older voters due to heavy subsidies in agriculture, while the DPJ has had greater support among youth and in urban areas. However, this has tended to favor the LDP, because sparsely populated rural districts have disproportionate weight in Japan's electoral system.

Some of the issues facing candidates were: the ongoing economic recession; reform of the public pension system; the extent of Japan's support of the U.S. in Iraq; Japan's relationship with North Korea; and the privatization of the postal service and Tokyo-area highways.

The last general election of the Lower House took place in June 2000 when Yoshiro Mori was Prime Minister.

Results

National newspapers concluded that the election benefitted the Democrat Party (DPJ) more so than the Liberal Democrat Party (LDP). The DPJ actually garnered the plurality of votes and gained 40 more seats, making it the largest opposition party with a total lower-house membership of 177. Among those in the ruling coalition, only the New Kōmeitō made gains, bringing its total lower-house membership to 34 from 31 members before the election. Since Prime Minister Koizumi was unable to gain more seats for the LDP based upon his high approval ratings — around 60% — some experts believe the election has left Koizumi a weakened Prime Minister while others point out that several of the Non-partisans were really of LDP, most notably 'Kato Koichi' and LDP had in fact maintained the number of seats.

The LDP performed well in rural areas while the DPJ performed well in urban areas. The turnout was 59.86%, the second lowest since 1945. The average age of new members of the house was 51.03, 3.2 years younger than in the previous election. Among new members, 302 were born after 1945. After the election, the total number of women in the lower-house decreased to 34 from 35 before the election.

Poll data collected early in the election season and in exit polls highlight the role of swing voters, who accounted for 18% of the total vote. According to Asahi Shimbun, more than half of swing voters voted for the DPJ.  These exit polls produced highly contradictory preliminary reports.  There was a case where DPJ was predicted to capture up to 230 seats, more than 50 above the actual result.

The Liberal Democrat Party failed to achieve an absolute majority by itself, requiring it to maintain its coalition with New Kōmeitō and the New Conservative Party. Senior politicians in the LDP attribute the results to disenfranchisement among traditional supporters of the LDP, resulting in an increased dependency on the coalition. Some politicians in the LDP are concerned about the influence of the New Kōmeitō (NK) on LDP policy because of the dependency.

Some experts believe the Democrat Party has emerged an effective opposition party to the entrenched Liberal Democrat Party. During the campaign, the DPJ produced an itemized policy manifesto — a first in post-war Japanese elections — and publicized a "shadow cabinet" (with Naoto Kan as Prime Minister), which is usually created by political parties during election season in the United Kingdom, for example. The DPJ also criticized the reforms proposed by Koizumi and the LDP's sluggishness in their implementation, as well as the LDP's position on Iraq while steering clear on other foreign issues.

Smaller parties performed poorly. The Social Democrat Party lost 3 seats, bringing their lower-house membership to 6, while the Japanese Communist Party lost 11 seats, bringing their total membership to 9 from 20 before the election.  Both parties thus lack the ability to propose a law alone since that requires minimum of 10 members.  The New Conservative Party lost 5 seats, lowering their total to 4 seats from 9 seats, and merged with the LDP shortly after the election.  The Japanese Communist Party blamed the negative results on the media, which they claimed focused on the LDP and DPJ.

Although the LDP failed to secure a simple majority, due to their coalition with the NK, on November 19, the Diet appointed Junichiro Koizumi the Prime Minister in its short special session (which elect the prime minister) and, within a month, the LDP regained a majority by absorbing the Conservative Party.

By prefecture

By PR block

References
Mainichi Shimbun: Analysis of the general election (in Japanese)

External links
BBC – Japanese election guide
LDP bloc weathers DPJ onslaught  The Japan Times

Japan
 
General elections in Japan
Japanese
Election and referendum articles with incomplete results